The ditto mark is a shorthand sign, used mostly in hand-written text, indicating that the words or figures above it are to be repeated. 

The mark is made using 'a pair of apostrophes'; 'a pair of marks  used underneath a word'; the symbol  (quotation mark); or the symbol  (right double quotation mark).

In the following example, the second line reads "Blue pens, box of twenty".
Black pens, box of twenty ... $2.10
Blue  "     "   "  "      ... $2.35

History 

Early evidence of ditto marks can be seen on a cuneiform tablet of the Neo-Assyrian period (934–608 BCE) where two vertical marks are used in a table of synonyms to repeat text.

In China the corresponding historical mark was two horizontal lines  (unicode  ), which is also the ancient ideograph of "two", equivalent to the modern ideograph . It is found in bronze script from the Zhou Dynasty, as in the example at right (circa 825 BCE).

The word ditto comes from the Tuscan language, where it is the past participle of the verb dire (to say), with the meaning of "said", as in the locution "the said story". The first recorded use of ditto with this meaning in English occurs in 1625. In English, the abbreviation "do." has sometimes been used.

Other languages
For Chinese, Japanese and Korean, there is the specific Unicode character  in the range CJK Symbols and Punctuation. This facilitates the setting of both marks on a single horizontal line in Asian vertical text. 

Other languages may use equivalent symbols. For example, in German  is used. In Swedish handwriting, a version using vertical lines to indicate the span of the cell in a table where an entry repeats is sometimes seen (––〃––).

See also
Dittography
Ibid.
Iteration mark

References

External links

:fr:Guillemet#Répétition at French Wikipedia

Typographical symbols